The second season of Dance Se Puder (Dance If You Can), a Brazilian talent show, aired as a segment of Programa Eliana., premiered on September 4, 2016. Eight teen celebrities compete. They are presented to a panel usually consisting of three judges. Viewers can vote and evict one participant per round. Jaime Arôxa and Ivan Santos are back as regular judges. The winner will earn R$50,000.

Format
This season has only eight contestants, two less than season one. Now they perform individually. Each contestant has to dance to a song chosen randomly and each has a week to prepare a dance performance. Each contestant receives a score on a scale from 0 to 10 by the three judges. The three scores are calculated. The lowest scoring participant is automatically up for elimination. A second person is chosen by the other participants to be in the bottom 2. The audience pick who they want to evict. The vote is set by text message.

Contestants

 The contestant won Dance Se Puder.
 The contestant was the runner-up of Dance Se Puder.
 The contestant was the second runner-up of Dance Se Puder.
 The contestant had the highest score of the week.
 The contestant had the second highest score of the week.
 The contestant was one of the worst but was not in the bottom two.
 The contestant was in the bottom two.
 The contestant was eliminated.
 The contestant won entry back into the competition.
 The contestant didn't win entry back into the competition.
 The contestant was voted as having the best performance of the season.
 The contestant did not participate in this episode.

Songs assigned 

 Voted the best performance of the season by the audience.

Scores

Nominations and audience's choice 

 "—" indicates the contestant didn't vote.

References

2016 Brazilian television seasons